is a fictional character from the Star Fox series of video games published by Nintendo. He was created by Shigeru Miyamoto along with Takaya Imamura, who also designed the character, and was based on the assistant director of the original Star Fox game. Slippy acts as the inventor and mechanic of Star Fox Team as well as the sidekick to Fox McCloud and Falco Lombardi.

Slippy first appeared in the 1993 game Star Fox. Since then, he has appeared in multiple Star Fox games. Reception to the character has been generally negative, with video game reviewers criticizing mainly his voice and appearance, which led Slippy to be included in several lists of the most annoying video game characters. On other hand, some reviewers praised Slippy for being a cute character.

Creation and design
The name "Slippy" in his name is a colloquial name to "Slippery" that was chosen by Dylan Cuthbert in order to represent his "clumsy nature". The original four members of the Star Fox Team are based on the staff for the first game. Slippy in particular is based on the assistant director, Yamada.

Appearances
 
Slippy's debut was in the 1993 Super Nintendo Entertainment System action game Star Fox. After antagonist Andross launches an attack against the planet Corneria, the Star Fox team resolves to stop him. Slippy's design is that of an anthropomorphic green frog (despite his name). He is a member of the Star Fox team of mercenaries. However, as Slippy is relatively unskilled at flying, he instead serves as the "brains" of the team, developing weapons, and performing mechanic work. Slippy serves as a sidekick to skilled teammates Fox McCloud and Falco Lombardi. He designed the "blaster" and "reflector" weapons that they use.Slippy makes a cameo appearance in the GameCube game Super Smash Bros. Melee and again in the Wii follow up Super Smash Bros. Brawl. he aphears in the "Shadow Moses Island" stage, conversing with Solid Snake about Falco if that character is selected. He also appears on the Lylat Cruise stage conversing with Star Fox and Star Wolf. In Super Smash Bros. for Wii U, Slippy converses with Star Fox in the Orbital Gate Assault stage from Star Fox: Assault. He also appears for the crossover of Starlink: Battle for Atlas.

Reception
Critical opinion of Slippy has been generally negative; criticism has been leveled primarily at his high-pitched voice. In his review of Star Fox 64 for Electronic Gaming Monthly, Crispin Boyer predicted that "It'll probably be every gamer's fantasy to whack Slippy, who sounds as if he's voiced by a 6-year-old girl". An article from IGN calls Slippy "An annoying croaking pest", also noting his "High-pitched cries for help". In an April Fools article IGN's Levi Buchanan epithetized his voice as "The sound of the earth cracking open just as the four horsemen visit plague and pestilence on humankind". GameSpot writer Glenn Rubenstein described Slippy in Star Fox 64 as androgynous. GameDaily also listed him as a character that make people want to mute their games, commenting that "until Star Fox 64 [sic] arrived, we liked amphibians".

Slippy has also been criticized for his inadequacy as a pilot; IGN stated that "he can never seem to help himself out of any kind of tight situation". The IGN team and Colin Moriarty ranked him third on their list of ten video game characters who should die, rationalizing that "we can't decide what makes him more annoying: his inadequacy in the cockpit or his ear-splitting voice". Slippy was ranked as the sixth video game sidekicks that GamesRadar's staff most hated, while 1UP.com placed him second in a similar list, criticizing the fact that he does not bring any special quality to the Star Fox's cast. Cheat Code Central included in their "Top 10 Lamest Video Game Characters". Complex included him among the ten video game characters who look like sex offenders. Slippy was also listed as one of the most annoying characters in video games by sources such Complex, Cracked.com, Cheat Code Central and Den of Geek.

In contrast to negative reception, GameSpy journalist Bryn Williams called him "That froggy legend". Slippy was also listed as one of 25th best sidekicks of video games by Maximum PC. Destructoid's Chad Concelmo said his voice is not reason to hate "the cute, sweet, and supportive member of the Star Fox team", listing him as one of "Ten hated videogame characters that I secretly like". UGO Networks also listed him among the cutest characters in video games. Similarly, Complex placed him seventh in their article about "cute characters that you wouldn't want to cross paths with in a dark alley if they decided to go bad", also ranking him second on their article about video game characters who look like ugly but are noble. In 2013, GamesRadar included Slippy among their "8 favourite video game mechanics", calling him "an essential part of Star Fox's core team".

References

External links

 Slippy Toad at Smash Wiki, the Super Smash Bros. wiki
Slippy Toad (video game character) at GiantBomb

Animal characters in video games
Anthropomorphic video game characters
Extraterrestrial characters in video games
Fictional frogs
Fictional inventors in video games
Fictional mechanics
Fictional mercenaries in video games
Fictional military personnel in video games
Fictional space pilots
Male characters in video games
Nintendo protagonists
Star Fox characters
Video game sidekicks
Video game characters introduced in 1993